Minnie Smythe (1872–1955) was a British landscape watercolourist.

She was trained by her father, Lionel Percy Smythe. Her work A Cottage Girl was included in the book Women Painters of the World. She showed works from 1896 until 1939 and is known for landscapes in the style of her father.

References

External links

ArtNet: More works by Smythe.

1872 births
1955 deaths
British women painters
20th-century British painters
19th-century British painters
20th-century British women artists
19th-century British women artists
British watercolourists
British landscape painters
Women watercolorists
British people of Dutch descent